Line 30 of the Chengdu Metro is a metro line currently under construction in Chengdu. Line 30's color is  Light Pink. Phase 1 is 27.74 km long with 24 stations, all underground. Line 30 will use 6-car Type-B rolling stock operating up to 80 km/h. Line 30 will be served by two depots at Gaobeiba and Hongjiaqiao.

History 
 On August 21, 2019, Line 30 is approved officially as part of the fourth phase expansion for the Chengdu Metro by the National Development and Reform Commission, confirming it for 2019–2024's subway construction plan.
 On March 18, 2020, construction started on Line 8 Phase 2, Line 19 Phase 2, Line 27 Phase 1, and Line 30 Phase 1.
 On July 17, 2020, Construction officially started for the 4 stations on Line 30 in Longquanyi District.

Stations

References 

Chengdu Metro lines
Transport infrastructure under construction in China